Andreas Georgiou Papandreou (5 February 1919 – 23 June 1996) was a Greek economist, politician and a dominant figure in Greek politics, known for founding the political party PASOK, which he led from 1974 to 1996.  He served three terms as the 3rd and 8th prime minister of Greece.

Papandreou's party win in the 1981 election was a milestone in the political history of Greece, since it was the first time that the elected government had a predominantly socialist political program. The achievements of his first two governments include the official recognition of the leftist and communist resistance groups of the Greek Resistance (EAM/ELAS) against the Axis occupation, the establishment of the National Health System and the Supreme Council for Personnel Selection (ASEP), the passage of Law 1264/1982 which secured the right to strike and greatly improved the rights of workers, the constitutional amendment of 1985–1986 which strengthened parliamentarism and reduced the powers of the indirectly-elected president, the conduct of an assertive and independent Greek foreign policy, the expansion in the power of local governments, many progressive reforms in Greek law and the granting of permission to the refugees of the Greek Civil War, of Greek ethnicity, to return home in Greece. During his tenure as the prime minister of Greece from 1981 to 1989, the public debt of Greece as a function of gross domestic product almost tripled.

The Panhellenic Socialist Movement (PASOK), which he founded and led, was the first non-communist political party in Greek history with a mass-based organization, introducing an unprecedented level of political and social participation in Greek society. In a poll conducted by Kathimerini in 2007, 48% of those polled called Papandreou the "most important Greek Prime Minister". In the same poll, the first four years of Papandreou's government after Metapolitefsi were voted as the best government Greece ever had. His father, Georgios Papandreou, and his son, George Papandreou have both also served as Prime Ministers of Greece.

Early life and career
Papandreou was born on the island of Chios, Greece, the son of Zofia (Sofia) Mineyko (1883–1981) and Greek liberal politician and future prime minister George Papandreou. His maternal grandfather was Polish-Lithuanian-born public figure Zygmunt Mineyko, and his maternal grandmother was Greek. Before university he attended Athens College, a private school in Greece. He attended the National and Kapodistrian University of Athens from 1937 until 1938 when, during the authoritarian, right-leaning Metaxas dictatorship, he was arrested for purported Trotskyism. Following representation in court by his father, he was allowed to leave for the US.

In 1943, Papandreou received a PhD degree in economics from Harvard University. Immediately after getting his doctorate, Papandreou joined America's war effort and volunteered for the US Navy, serving as an examiner of models for repairing warships, and as a hospital corpsman at the Bethesda Naval Hospital for war wounded. He returned to Harvard in 1946 and served as a lecturer and associate professor until 1947. He then held professorships at the University of Minnesota, Northwestern University, the University of California, Berkeley (where he was chair of the Department of Economics), Stockholm University and York University in Toronto where he worked alongside long term academic advisor Christos Paraskevopoulos.

Personal life
He was married to Christina Rasia from 1941 to 1951. In 1948, he entered into a relationship with University of Minnesota journalism student Margaret Chant.

After Chant obtained a divorce, and after his own divorce from his first wife Christina Rasia, Papandreou and Chant were married in 1951. They had three sons and a daughter. Papandreou also had, with Swedish actress and TV presenter Ragna Nyblom, a daughter out of wedlock, Emilia Nyblom, who was born in 1969 in Sweden.

Papandreou divorced his second wife in 1989, and married Dimitra Liani who was 37 years his junior. He died in 1996. His will generated much discussion because he left everything to his 41-year-old third wife. He left nothing to his second wife, to whom he was married for 38 years, their four children, or his illegitimate Swedish daughter.

Political career

Papandreou returned to Greece in 1959, where he headed an economic development research program, by invitation of Prime Minister Konstantinos Karamanlis. In 1960, he was appointed chairman of the board of directors, general director of the Athens Economic Research Center, and advisor to the Bank of Greece. In 1963, his father George Papandreou, head of the Center Union, became prime minister of Greece. Andreas became his chief economic advisor. He renounced his American citizenship and was elected to the Greek Parliament in the 1964 Greek legislative election. He immediately became Minister to the First Ministry of State (in effect, assistant Prime Minister).

Papandreou took publicly a neutral stand during the Cold War and wished for Greece to be more independent from the United States. He also criticized the massive presence of American military and intelligence in Greece, and sought to remove senior officers with anti-democratic tendencies from the Greek military. He disagreed also with the American policy on the Cyprus dispute.

In 1965, while the "Aspida" conspiracy within the Hellenic Army (alleged by the political opposition to involve Andreas personally) was being investigated, Georgios Papandreou decided to remove the defense minister and assume the post himself. Constantine II of Greece refused to endorse this move and essentially forced George Papandreou's resignation during the events of the Apostasia of 1965. Greece entered a period of political polarisation and instability which ended with the coup d'état of 21 April 1967.

When the Regime of the Colonels led by Georgios Papadopoulos seized power in April 1967, Andreas was incarcerated. Soon after, Gust Avrakotos, a Greek-American CIA case officer assigned to Athens, told the Colonels that the U.S. Government wished for Papandreou to be released and allowed to leave the country with his family. Avrakotos violated his orders, however, and unofficially advised the Colonels to, "Shoot the motherfucker because he's going to come back to haunt you". His father George Papandreou was put under house arrest. George, already at advanced age, died in 1968. Under heavy pressure from American academics and intellectuals, such as John Kenneth Galbraith, a friend of Andreas since their Harvard days, the military regime released Andreas on condition that he leave the country. Papandreou then moved to Sweden with his wife, four children, and mother. There he accepted a post at Stockholm University. In Paris, while in exile, Andreas Papandreou formed an anti-dictatorship organization, the Panhellenic Liberation Movement (PAK), and toured the world rallying opposition to the Greek military regime. Despite his former American citizenship and academic career in the United States, Papandreou held the Central Intelligence Agency responsible for the 1967 coup and became increasingly critical of the federal government of the United States, often stating that Greece was under "US occupation".

In the early 1970s, during the latter phase of the dictatorship in Greece, Papandreou, along with most leading Greek politicians in exile or in Greece, opposed the process of political normalisation attempted by Georgios Papadopoulos and his appointed PM, Spyros Markezinis. On 6 August 1974, Andreas Papandreou called an extraordinary meeting of the National Congress of PAK in Winterthur, Switzerland, which decided its dissolution without announcing it publicly.

Papandreou returned to Greece after the events in Cyprus and the fall of the junta in 1974, during metapolitefsi. He was offered the leadership of his father's old party, which had evolved into Centre Union – New Forces. However, he not only turned it down, but rejected his father's ideological heritage as a Venizelist liberal, declaring himself a democratic socialist. To that end, he formed a new "radical" party, the Panhellenic Socialist Movement (PASOK). Most of his former PAK companions, as well as members of other leftist groups such as the Democratic Defense joined in the new party. He also testified in the first of the Greek Junta Trials about the alleged involvement of the junta with the Central Intelligence Agency.

In the 1974 elections, PASOK received only 13.5% of the vote, but in 1977 it polled 25%, and Papandreou became leader of the opposition.

The "Change"

At the 1981 elections, PASOK won a landslide victory over the conservative New Democracy party, and Papandreou became Greece's first socialist prime minister. The party's main slogan was Allagí (change).

In office, Papandreou backtracked from much of his campaign rhetoric and followed a more conventional approach. Greece did not withdraw from NATO, United States troops and military bases were not ordered out of Greece, and Greek membership in the European Economic Community continued, largely because Papandreou proved very capable of securing monetary aid for Greece. In domestic affairs, Papandreou's government immediately carried out a massive programme of wealth redistribution upon coming into office that immediately increased the availability of entitlement aid to the unemployed and lower wage earners. Pensions, together with average wages and the minimum wage, were increased in real terms, and changes were made to labour laws which up until 1984 made it difficult for employers to make workers redundant. The impact of the PASOK Government's social and economic policies was such that it was estimated in 1988 that two-thirds of the decrease in inequality that occurred in Greece between 1974 and 1982 took place between 1981 and 1982.

During its time in office, Papandreou's government carried through sweeping reforms of social policy by introducing a welfare state, significantly expanding welfare measures, expanding health care coverage (the "National Health System" was instituted, which made modern medical procedures available in rural areas for the first time,) promoting state-subsidized tourism (social tourism) for lower-income families, index-linking pensions, and funding social establishments for the elderly. Rural areas benefited from improved state services, the rights and income of low paid workers were considerably improved, and refugees from the Civil War living in exile were allowed to return with impunity. He also officially recognized the role of leftist partisan groups in the Greek Resistance during the Axis Occupation. The first law recognizing the Greek Resistance was passed in 1949 excluding partisan groups that fought against the Greek State in the Greek Civil War (A.N. 971)  In 1982 his government passed the 1285 law that abolished this exception.

A number of other reforms were carried out in areas such as trade union rights, shop closing and reopening times, social security, education, health and safety, and work councils. A more progressive taxation scheme was introduced and budgetary support for artistic and cultural programmes was increased. Social aid became available to deaf and dumb adults as well as for persons with mental disabilities, minimum pensions were indexed to the minimum wage, a social assistance pension for those aged 68 and over was introduced, and “All uninsured employed and self-employed individuals are covered by IKA (social insurance fund).” Social security benefits were also adjusted to price increases, while social assistance disability benefits were extended to new categories. Special family allowances were established “for unmarried and uninsured mothers and for children whose father has died, is disabled, or has abandoned the family.” Wages and pensions became automatically adjusted in line with the consumer price index every 4 months on the basis of economic forecasts. In addition, all women with unmarried children under 21 could retire at 55, early retirement was extended to more occupations, and low-income households received housing allowances. The role of OAED in vocational guidance and training was strengthened, while subsidies for returning Greek migrants were introduced. A national system against unemployment was set up that granted benefits to young people and elderly unemployed persons. In addition, Law 1545/85 “eases conditions for entitlement to unemployment benefit, extends the duration of benefit for certain groups and introduces the possibility of unemployment benefit for young first-job-seekers.” Saturday working was also abolished for certain categories of workers. The government also introduced a wage indexation system which helped to close the gap modestly between the highest and lowest paid workers, while the share of GNP devoted to social welfare, social insurance, and health was significantly increased. Other major policy changes included the establishment of parental leave for both parents and child care centres, maternity allowances, community health centres, and the encouragement of women to join agricultural cooperatives as full members, an option which previously had not been open to women.

As part of Papandreou's "Social Contract", new liberalising laws were introduced which decriminalised adultery, abolished (in theory) the dowry system, eased the process for obtaining a divorce, and enhanced the legal status of women.
In 1984, for instance, women were guaranteed equal pay for equal work. Papandreou also introduced various reforms in the administration and curriculum of the Greek educational system, allowing students to participate in the election process for their professors and deans in the university, and abolishing tenure. The university system was expanded, with the number of students doubling between 1981 and 1986, while the system was reorganised to provide the departments with more power and permit greater participation in their management. The effect of these reforms was however, limited by poor research facilities, a shortage of qualified teaching staff, a lack of resources, and often inefficient administration.

In a move strongly opposed by the Church of Greece, Papandreou introduced, for the first time in Greece, the process of civil marriage. Prior to the institution of civil marriages in Greece, the only legally recognized marriages were those conducted in the Church of Greece. Couples seeking a civil marriage had to get married outside Greece, generally in Italy. Under PASOK, the Greek State also appropriated real estate properties previously owned by the Church.

A major part of Papandreou's  ("change") involved driving out the "old families" (literally "hearths", using the traditional Greek expression for the genealogy of families), which dominated Greek politics and economy and belonged to the traditional Greek right.

Papandreou was comfortably re-elected in the 1985 Greek legislative election with 45.8% of the vote, and won still further popularity in March 1987 by his strong leadership during the 1987 Greek-Turkish crisis in the Aegean Sea. However, from the summer of 1988, his premiership became increasingly clouded by controversy, as the Bank of Crete scandal exploded. In 1989, he divorced his wife Margaret Chant and married Dimitra Liani (Florina, 30 April 1955), without issue.

"Koskotas scandal", trial and return to power

In 1989, after the arrest of George Koskotas in the US, he was indicted by the Hellenic Parliament in connection with a US$200 million Bank of Crete embezzlement scandal, and was accused of facilitating the embezzlement by ordering state corporations to transfer their holdings to the Bank of Crete, where the interest was allegedly skimmed off to benefit PASOK, and possibly some of its highest functionaries.

Following the many repercussions of the so-called Koskotas scandal, PASOK was roundly defeated at the June 1989 elections, losing 36 seats in one of the largest defeats of a sitting government in modern Greek history. However, due to changes made in electoral law one year before the elections by the then reigning PASOK administration, New Democracy was not able to form a government despite finishing with the most seats. The new law required a party to win 50 percent of the vote to govern alone, and ND had come up just short of that threshold. As a result, even though New Democracy finished 20 seats ahead of PASOK, it was unable to garner support from the five MPS it needed to make its leader, Konstantinos Mitsotakis, prime minister. The ensuing deadlock led to fresh elections in November 1989 Greek legislative election. Papandreou's PASOK's won 40% of the popular vote, compared to the rival New Democracy's 46%. As before, even though New Democracy finished well ahead of PASOK in seat count, it was not able to form a government. A third election in 1990 followed, and Mitsotakis eventually received enough support to form a government.

In the wake of three consecutive elections between 1989 and 1990, the New Democracy leader, Constantine Mitsotakis, eventually received sufficient support to form a government. In January 1992, Papandreou himself was cleared of any wrongdoing in the Koskotas scandal after a 7–6 vote in the specially convened Supreme Special Court trial.

After 3 years of Mitsotakis' government, Papandreou and PASOK won again the 1993 election, and returned to power; in 1994, his government decided to impose an economic embargo on North Macedonia, due to the ongoing naming dispute regarding the name of the then Republic of Macedonia. In 1995, an interim accord was signed between the two countries to temporarily address the matter and the name issue.

However, his fragile health kept him from exercising firm political leadership. He was hospitalized with advanced heart disease and renal failure on 21 November 1995 and finally retired from office on 16 January 1996. He died on 23 June 1996, with his funeral procession producing crowds, ranging from "hundreds of thousands" to "millions" to bid farewell to Andreas. In 1999, Papandreou was posthumously awarded the Swedish Order of the Polar Star.

Economic policies
The expenditure programme of the Papandreou government during 1981–1990 has been described as excessive by its conservative critics. The excessive expenditures were not accompanied by corresponding revenue increases and this led to increases in budget deficits and the public debt. Many economic indicators worsened during 1981–1990 and the economic policies of his government were condemned as a failure by his critics. Various nationalizations of enterprises and the increase of the public sector was another point of critic by the conservatives.

On the other hand, according to his supporters they were successful, drastically increasing the purchasing power of the vast majority of Greeks, with personal incomes growing by 26% in real terms during the course of the 1980s. Papandreou's increased spending in his early years in power (1981–1985) was necessary in order to heal the deep wounds of the Greek society, a society that was still deeply divided by the brutal memories of the Civil War and the right-wing repression that followed; furthermore, the postwar government philosophy of the Greek conservatives simply saw the state as a tool of repression, with very little money spent on health or education. Furthermore, Papandreou's governments managed to handle the inflation and unemployment rate, maintain the growth of the economy, while according to his supporters the external debt in 1989 was in normal levels (around 65% of GDP).

International politics
Papandreou was praised for conducting an independent and multidimensional foreign policy, and proved to be a master of the diplomatic game, thus increasing the importance of Greece in the international system. He was co-creator in 1982 of, and subsequently an active participant in, a movement promoted by the Parliamentarians for Global Action, the Initiative of the Six, which included, besides the Greek PM, Mexico's president Miguel de la Madrid, Argentina's president Raúl Alfonsín, Sweden's prime minister Olof Palme, Tanzania's president Julius Nyerere and India's prime minister Indira Gandhi. The movement's stated objective was the "promotion of peace and progress for all mankind". After various initiatives, mostly directed at pressuring the United States and the Soviet Union to stop nuclear testing and reduce the level of nuclear arms, it eventually disbanded.

Papandreou's rhetoric was at times antagonistic to the United States. He was the first western prime minister to visit General Wojciech Jaruzelski in Poland. According to the Foreign Affairs magazine Papandreou went on record as saying that since the USSR is not a capitalist country "one cannot label it an imperialist power." According to Papandreou, "the Soviet Union represent[ed] a factor that restrict the expansion of capitalism and its imperialistic aims". This antagonistic stance made him extremely popular, because the previous conservative governments were seen by the Greek people as slavishly loyal to US interests.

Papandreou's government was the first in post-war Greece that redirected the nation's defense policy to suit its own security needs, and not those of the United States. According to historian Marion Sarafis, from 1947 until 1981, the US had more influence in Greece's military policy than the indigenous Greek high command, largely due to the decisive role played by the US in the Greek Civil War.

Papandreou supported the causes of various national liberation movements in the world, and agreed for Greece to host representatives offices of many such organisations. He also supported the cause of Palestinian liberation, met repeatedly with PLO chairman Yasser Arafat and condemned Israeli policies in the occupied territories. He was a supporter of the two-state solution for the conflict.

Papandreou's image and influence in Greek popular culture
Among both his supporters and his opponents, Papandreou was referred to simply by his first name, "Andreas", a unique situation in Greek political history, and a testament to his charisma and popularity. Andreas was also famous for wearing his business suits with turtleneck sweaters (ζιβάγκο in Greek), instead of the traditional white shirt and tie; he thus created a huge fashion, mainly but not exclusively among his political supporters. His first appearance in the Greek Parliament with a black turtleneck instead of shirt and tie caused a massive uproar in the conservative press, who considered him disrespectful of Parliament; however, the whole issue only added to his popularity.

Legacy

Papandreou exercised a more independent foreign policy elevating Greece's profile among non-aligned nations. He affirmed Greece's independence in setting her own policy agenda, both internally and externally, free from any foreign domination.

His opponents on the left, on the other hand, including the Communist Party of Greece (KKE), accused him of supporting, in practice, the agenda of NATO and the United States.

Andreas Papandreou is widely acknowledged as having shifted political power from the traditional conservative Greek Right, which had dominated Greek politics for decades, to a more populist and centre-left locus. This included the so-called pariahs in politics as of the end of the Greek Civil War, which were given a chance to prove themselves in democratically elected governments. This shift in the Greek political landscape helped heal some of the old civil war wounds; Greece became more pluralistic, and more in line with the political system of other western European countries. Papandreou also systematically pursued inclusionist politics which ended the sociopolitical and economic exclusion of many social classes in the post-civil war era.

It is also acknowledged that Papandreou, along with Karamanlis, played a leading role in establishing democracy in Greece during metapolitefsi. He is described as both prudent and a realist, despite his appearance as a leftist ideologue, and charismatic orator. His choices to remain in the European Union and NATO, both of which he vehemently opposed for many years, proved his pragmatic approach. Even his approach of negotiating the removal of the US bases from Greece was diplomatic, because although it was agreed to remove them, some of the bases remained. His skillful handling of these difficult policies had the effect of providing common policy goals to the political forces of Greece. Complementing this political realism, Andreas' ability to publicly say no to the Americans gave Greeks a sense of national independence and psychological self-worth.
Perhaps his most important achievement was the establishment of political equality among Greeks; during his years in power the defeated left-wingers of the Civil War were no longer treated like second-class citizens and a vital part of national memory was reclaimed.

Papandreou's successor in office, Costas Simitis, broke with a number of Papandreou's approaches.

Papandreou's son, George Papandreou, was elected leader of PASOK in February 2004 and prime minister during the October 2009 general elections. A common slogan among PASOK followers in political rallies, invokes Andreas' legacy with the chant "Andrea, zis! Esi mas odigis!" ("Andreas, you are still alive! You're leading us!").

In two separate polls, conducted in 2007 and 2010, Andreas Papandreou was voted as the best prime minister of Greece since the restoration of democracy in 1974.

Theodore Katsanevas 
Until their divorce in 2000, Papandreou's daughter Sofia was married to the academic and politician Theodore Katsanevas. In Papandreou's will, he accused Katsanevas of being a "disgrace to the family" 
and claimed that "his aim was to politically inherit the history of struggle of Georgios Papandreou and Andreas Papandreou".

Works
 The Location and Scope of the Entrepreneurial Function, Harvard University, 1943
 Economics and the social sciences, Economic Journal, 1950
 An experimental test of an Axiom in the Theory of Choice, Econometrica, 1953
 Competition and its regulation, Prentice-Hall, 1954
 A Test of a Stochastic Theory of Choice, Econometrica, 1957
 Economics as a Science, Lippincott, 1958
 Fundamentals of model construction in macro-economics, Center of Economic Research, 1962
 A Strategy for Greek Economic Development, Center of Economic Research, 1962
 Democracy and National Rebirth, Fexis, Athens, 1966
 The Political Element in Economic Development, Almqvist & Wiksell, 1966
 Toward a Totalitarian World?, Norstedts, Stockholm, 1969
 Man's freedom, Columbia University Press, New York, 1970
 Democracy at gunpoint: The Greek Front (I Dimokratia sto apospasma), Doubleday & Co., New York, 1970
 Paternalistic Capitalism, The University of Minnesota Press, 1972
 Economic Development - Rhetoric and Reality, The University of British Columbia, Vancouver, 1973
 Project Selection for National Plans, Praeger Publishers, New York, 1974
 The Impact Approach to Project Selection, Praeger Publishers, New York, 1974
 The Method of Repercussions in Investment Selection, Praeger Publishers, New York, 1974
 Imperialism and Economic Development, Athens, 1975
 Greece to the Greeks, Athens, 1976
 Transition to Socialism, Athens, 1977
 Mediterranean Socialism, Lerici, Cosenza, 1977

Decorations and awards
  Knight Grand Cross of the Order of Isabella the Catholic (1983)
  Star of People's Friendship (1985)
  Order of the Polar Star (1999)

References

Further reading
 Clogg, Richard. "Andreas Papandreou–A political profile." Mediterranean Politics 1#3 (1996): 382–387.
 Kariotis, Theodore C., ed. The Greek Socialist Experiment: Papandreou's Greece, 1981-1989. (Pella Publishing Company, 1992).
 Wilsford, David, ed. Political leaders of contemporary Western Europe: a biographical dictionary (Greenwood, 1995) pp. 361–68.
Ηλίας Χρυσοχοϊδης (Ilias Chrissochoidis), "Η οικονομική πολιτική της Ενωσης Κέντρου", Το ΒΗΜΑ, 10 Απριλίου 2022, σελ. Α38(62), και Οικονομικός Ταχυδρόμος, 17 Απριλίου 2022.

External links

 The Andreas Papandreou Foundation
 Biography from pasok.gr
 Tribute to Andreas Papandreou
 Clara Thomas Archives and Special Collections – Archival photographs of Andreas Papandreou from the Toronto Telegram Fonds – Clara Thomas Archives and Special Collections, York University

|-

|-

|-

|-

|-

|-

 
1919 births
1996 deaths
20th-century Greek economists
20th-century prime ministers of Greece
Burials at the First Cemetery of Athens
Centre Union politicians
Children of national leaders
European democratic socialists
Dependency theorists
Eastern Orthodox Christians from Greece
Greek anti-capitalists
Greek emigrants to France
Greek emigrants to Sweden
Greek emigrants to the United States
Greek exiles
Greek expatriates in Canada
Greek MPs 1964–1967
Greek MPs 1974–1977
Greek MPs 1977–1981
Greek MPs 1981–1985
Greek MPs 1985–1989
Greek MPs 1989 (June–November)
Greek MPs 1989–1990
Greek MPs 1990–1993
MPs of Achaea
Greek people of Polish descent
Greek socialists
Republicanism in Greece
Harvard University alumni
Knights Grand Cross of the Order of Isabella the Catholic
Leaders of PASOK
Ministers for Northern Greece
Ministers of National Defence of Greece
National and Kapodistrian University of Athens alumni
Order of the Polar Star
Andreas
Politicians from Athens
Members of the Panhellenic Liberation Movement
Former United States citizens
Prime Ministers of Greece
Academic staff of Stockholm University
United States Navy personnel of World War II
University of California, Berkeley faculty
University of Minnesota alumni
Academic staff of York University